The Catlow Theater is a historic single-screen movie theater located in downtown Barrington, Illinois, United States.

History
Wright Catlow was a businessman in Barrington whose father had commissioned The Auditorium in 1914, a gathering place for dances and community meetings. Seeking to follow his father's legacy and build a community building, Catlow commissioned the theater in May 1927.

Betts & Holcomb served as the architects and the interiors were designed by Prairie School sculptor and designer Alfonso Iannelli. The theater was primarily designed in the Tudor Revival style ornamented to portray a medieval English hall. In large part due to Iannelli's involvement, the Catlow is listed on the National Register of Historic Places. Iannelli's Catlow design includes the stenciling on the Catlow's ceiling, walls and beams along with the sculpted gargoyle-like heads that border each ceiling truss and the "Fountain Idyll" sculpture in the inner lobby. Other highlights include three coat-of-arms wall murals, iron wall sconces, the detailed woodwork on both of the organ lofts and the original hand painted stage curtain.

Catlow's brother Chester played the theater organ. The theater originally showed silent films and featured vaudeville performances on Sundays. These performances attracted talent such as Gene Autry and Sally Rand. In 1934, the theater began to show only movies. Catlow sold the theater to film booker Ed Skehan in 1964. On August 21, 1989, the theater was recognized by the National Park Service with a listing on the National Register of Historic Places.

References

External links 

 Official Catlow Theater website

Cinemas and movie theaters in Chicago
National Register of Historic Places in Lake County, Illinois
Buildings and structures in Barrington, Illinois
1927 establishments in Illinois
Theatres on the National Register of Historic Places in Illinois